A shibboleth is any distinguishing practice that is indicative of one's social or regional origin.

Shibboleth or Shiboleth may also refer to:

Arts and entertainment 
 Shibboleth (artwork), a 2007 artwork by Doris Salcedo
 "Shibboleth" (Law & Order: Criminal Intent), an episode of Law & Order: Criminal Intent 
 "Shibboleth" (The West Wing), an episode of The West Wing

Computing 
 Shibboleth Single Sign-on architecture, a trusted computing architecture for single sign-on

Places 
 Shibboleth, Missouri, a community in the United States